In physics, the Pauli–Lubanski pseudovector is an operator defined from the momentum and angular momentum, used in the quantum-relativistic description of angular momentum. It is named after Wolfgang Pauli and Józef Lubański, 

It describes the spin states of moving particles. It is the generator of the little group of the Poincaré group, that is the maximal subgroup (with four generators) leaving the eigenvalues of the four-momentum vector  invariant.

Definition

where
  is the four-dimensional totally antisymmetric Levi-Civita symbol;
  is the relativistic angular momentum tensor operator;
  is the four-momentum operator.

In the language of exterior algebra, it can be written as the Hodge dual of a trivector,

Note , and 

 evidently satisfies

as well as the following commutator relations,

Consequently, 

The scalar  is a Lorentz-invariant operator, and commutes with the four-momentum, and can thus serve as a label for irreducible unitary representations of the Poincaré group. That is, it can serve as the label for the spin, a feature of the spacetime structure of the representation, over and above the relativistically invariant label  for the mass of all states in a representation.

Little group
On an eigenspace  of the 4-momentum operator  with 4-momentum eigenvalue  of the Hilbert space of a quantum system (or for that matter the standard representation with  interpreted as momentum space acted on by 5×5 matrices with the upper left 4×4 block an ordinary Lorentz transformation, the last column reserved for translations and the action effected on elements  (column vectors) of momentum space with  appended as a fifth row, see standard texts) the following holds:
 For every irreducible unitary representation of  there is an irreducible unitary representation of the full Poincaré group called an induced representation.

The best way to see that an irreducible unitary representation actually is obtained is to exhibit its action on an element with arbitrary 4-momentum eigenvalue  in the representation space thus obtained. Irreducibility follows from the construction of the representation space.

Massive fields

In quantum field theory, in the case of a massive field, the Casimir invariant  describes the total spin of the particle, with eigenvalues

Since this is a Lorentz invariant quantity, it will be the same in all other reference frames.

It is also customary to take  to describe the spin projection along the third direction in the rest frame.

where

is the energy–momentum relation.

For particles with non-zero mass, and the fields associated with such particles,

Massless fields

In general, in the case of non-massive representations, two cases may be distinguished.
For massless particles, 

where  is the dynamic mass moment vector. So, mathematically, 2 = 0 does not imply 2 = 0.

Continuous spin representations
In the more general case, the components of  transverse to  may be non-zero, thus yielding the family of representations referred to as the cylindrical luxons ("luxon" is another term for "massless particle"), their identifying property being that the components of  form a Lie subalgebra isomorphic to the 2-dimensional Euclidean group , with the longitudinal component of  playing the role of the rotation generator, and the transverse components the role of translation generators. However, there are no known physical cases of fundamental particles or fields in this family. It can be argued that continuous spin states possess an internal degree of freedom not seen in observed massless particles.

Helicity representations 

where

so the invariant is represented by the helicity operator

All particles that interact with the weak nuclear force, for instance, fall into this family, since the definition of weak nuclear charge (weak isospin) involves helicity, which, by above, must be an invariant. The appearance of non-zero mass in such cases must then be explained by other means, such as the Higgs mechanism. Even after accounting for such mass-generating mechanisms, however, the photon (and therefore the electromagnetic field) continues to fall into this class, although the other mass eigenstates of the carriers of the electroweak force (the  boson and anti-boson and  boson) acquire non-zero mass.

Neutrinos were formerly considered to fall into this class as well. However, because neutrinos have been observed to oscillate in flavour, it is now known that at least two of the three mass eigenstates of the left-helicity neutrinos and right-helicity anti-neutrinos each must have non-zero mass.

See also
Center of mass (relativistic)
Wigner's classification
Angular momentum operator
Casimir operator
Chirality
Pseudovector
Pseudotensor
Induced representation

Notes

References

Quantum field theory
Representation theory of Lie algebras